Peter Austin Nuttall (1792 or 1793 – 9 December 1869) was an English editor and classicist best known for dictionaries. He was born in Ormskirk, Lancashire and moved to London after completing his studies, gaining a doctorate from Aberdeen University in 1822. He was a contributor and possibly an editor of The Gentleman's Magazine between 1820 and 1837.  From 1825 his editions of Latin authors were published. In 1839 he became a partner in a printing business, producing classics, educational reference books, anti-Catholic apologetics,  and revised editions of older dictionaries such as Walker's and Johnson's. In 1840 he petitioned Parliament against the Copyright Bill. In 1863 Nuttall's Standard Pronouncing Dictionary of the English Language was published. Nuttall died bankrupt and was survived by five children; his wife and at least three children predeceased him. Subsequently, Frederick Warne & Co published further dictionaries under his name as late as 1973, and The Nuttall Encyclopædia in 1900 (revised up to 1956).

Bibliography

Literary editions
 
 
 
 
 
 
Reference works

References

Sources

Citations

External links
 

English book publishers (people)
English lexicographers
English editors
People from Ormskirk
Alumni of the University of Aberdeen
1790s births
1869 deaths
19th-century English businesspeople
19th-century lexicographers